The kingdom of Powys covered the eastern part of central Wales.  Regions included Builth and Gwerthrynion. It is important to note it was occupied by the Irish for a few years by Banadl (usually given as 441–447 AD), and was united with Gwynedd in 854 upon the death of Cyngen ap Cadell by his nephew Rhodri.

Rulers of Powys

Kings of Powys

House of Gwertherion 

 Gwrtheyrn (High-King Vortigern), married to Sevira, daughter of Magnus Maximus
 Cadeyern Fendigaid (c. 430–447), reputed to be the eldest son of Gwrtheyrn, blessed by Saint Germanus
 Cadell Ddyrnllwg (c. 447–460)
 Rhyddfedd Frych (c. 480)
 Cyngen Glodrydd (c. 500)
 Pasgen ap Cyngen (c. 530)
 Morgan ap Pasgen (c. 540)
 Brochwel Ysgithrog (c. 550)
 Cynan Garwyn (?–610)
 Selyf ap Cynan (610–613)
 Manwgan ap Selyf (613)
 Eiludd Powys (613–?)
 Beli ap Eiludd (c. 655)
 Gwylog ap Beli (695?–725)
 Elisedd ap Gwylog (725–755?)
 Brochfael ap Elisedd (755?–773)
 Cadell ap Brochfael (773–808)
 Cyngen ap Cadell (808–854) - throne usurped by Rhodri Mawr of Gwynedd and exiled to Rome where the family endured

House of Manaw 

 Rhodri Mawr (854–878) of Gwynedd, allegedly inheriting through his mother Nest, according to some manuscripts. Other manuscripts (eg. Mostyn manuscript 117) have his mother as Essyllt ferch Cynan (thought to be the daughter of Cynan Dindaethwy of Gwynedd).
 Merfyn ap Rhodri (878–900) (house of Aberffraw)
 Llywelyn ap Merfyn (900–942) (house of Aberffraw)
 Hywel Dda (942–950) (house of Dinefwr usurped from the Aberffraw line of Manaw)
 Owain ap Hywel (950–986) (Mathrafal dynasty, cadet branch of the House of Dinefwr)
 Maredudd ap Owain (986–999)
 Llywelyn ap Seisyll (999–1023), husband of Angharad, daughter of Maredudd ab Owain
 Rhydderch ap Iestyn (1023–1033)
 Iago ap Idwal (1033–1039)
 Gruffydd ap Llywelyn, invader and prince of Gwynedd (1039–1063)

Mathrafal Princes of Powys 

 Bleddyn ap Cynfyn (1063–1075)
 Iorwerth ap Bleddyn (1075–1103 (part))
 Cadwgan ap Bleddyn (1075–1111 (part))
 Owain ap Cadwgan (1111–1116 (part))
 Maredudd ap Bleddyn (1116–1132)
 Madog ap Maredudd (1132–1160)

From 1160 Powys was split into two parts. The southern part was later called Powys Wenwynwyn after Gwenwynwyn ab Owain "Cyfeiliog" ap Madog, while the northern part was called Powys Fadog after Madog ap Gruffydd "Maelor" ap Madog.

Family tree

See also
 List of rulers of Wales

External links
 The History Files: Kingdoms of the Cymru Celts – Powys
Kings of Powys: British Monarchs

Powys, list of monarchs of
 List